The south-western mulch-skink (Hemiergis gracilipes)  is a species of skink found in Western Australia.

References

Hemiergis
Reptiles described in 1870
Taxa named by Franz Steindachner